Payana is a children's game, originally called "kapichua".  

Similar to Jacks, the game is played with five little stones, and involves picking them from the floor in the time between one stone being thrown up into the air and it being caught again.

Originating from Brazil and gaining recognition in Argentina, the game was popularized in South America during the 1960s.

Children's games